Shusef (also Romanized as Shūsef, Shoosaf, and Shūsf; also known as Shusp) is a city in and the capital of Shusef District, in Nehbandan County, South Khorasan Province, Iran. At the 2006 census, its population was 2,338, in 572 families.

References 

Populated places in Nehbandan County

Cities in South Khorasan Province